Victorious is an American sitcom that premiered on Nickelodeon on March 27, 2010, and aired until February 2, 2013. The series stars Victoria Justice as Tori Vega, a teenage girl who attends Hollywood Arts High School, a performing arts school with a group of students. It was announced on August 10, 2012, that the series would not be renewed.

Series overview

Episodes

Season 1 (2010–11)

Season 2 (2011)

Season 3 (2012)

Season 4 (2012–13)

References

External links
 
 List of Victorious episodes at TV Guide.com

Lists of American children's television series episodes
Lists of American sitcom episodes
Lists of American teen comedy television series episodes
Lists of Nickelodeon television series episodes
Victorious